Stark County is a county located in the U.S. state of Ohio. As of the 2020 census, the population was 374,853. Its county seat is Canton. The county was created in 1808 and organized the next year. It is named for John Stark, an officer in the American Revolutionary War.

Stark County is included in the Canton-Massillon, OH Metropolitan Statistical Area, which is also included in the Cleveland-Akron-Canton, OH Combined Statistical Area.

History
Stark County was named in honor of American Revolutionary War General John Stark. John Stark (August 28, 1728 – May 8, 1822) was a general who served in the American Continental Army during the American Revolutionary War. He became widely known as the "Hero of Bennington" for his exemplary service at the Battle of Bennington in 1777.

In the 1760s and 1770s Moravian missionaries from Pennsylvania came to preach the gospel to the native people, and also to lead and resettle already converted native people migrating away from whites encroaching on their land in Pennsylvania. The earliest of these were Christian Frederick Post and John Heckewelder. See also the history of neighboring Tuscarawas County, Ohio

The first permanent settlements were established in 1805, beginning with Canton. Possibly 80% of the early settlers were German-speakers from Pennsylvania, although others came from Virginia, New York, and New England. Lumbering and sawmills were important early industries, to cater to the enormous demand for lumber from the incoming settlers. Stark County was originally part of Columbiana County, but was split off in 1807.

At the start of the Civil War the men of Stark County were quick to volunteer to preserve the Union. As of 1862 over 1,100 had enlisted.

During the early 20th century, Stark County was an important location in the early development of professional football. The rivalry between the Massillon Tigers and Canton Bulldogs helped bring the Ohio League to prominence in the mid-1900s (decade) and again in the late 1910s. The Bulldogs ended up a charter member of the National Football League, where it played for several years. (The role Stark County had in developing the game is part of the reason the Pro Football Hall of Fame is located in Canton.) Two relatively large football stadiums, Tom Benson Hall of Fame Stadium in Canton and Paul Brown Tiger Stadium in Massillon, are still in use (albeit now mostly for high school football), with Tom Benson Hall of Fame Stadium hosting the NFL's annual Pro Football Hall of Fame Game each year.

In the later 20th century, Stark County's voting record swung from one party to another, closely tracking the winner of the U.S. Presidential election. Even within the swing state of Ohio, Stark County is regarded as a quintessential bellwether, and thus presidential candidates have typically made multiple visits to the region. Major media outlets typically pay close attention to the election results in the county. The New York Times in particular has covered the county's citizens and their voting concerns in a series of features each election cycle for over a decade.

Geography

Adjacent counties

 Portage County (north)
 Mahoning County (northeast)
 Columbiana County (east)
 Carroll County (southeast)
 Tuscarawas County (south)
 Holmes County (southwest)
 Wayne County (west)
 Summit County (northwest)

Major Highways

National protected area
 First Ladies National Historic Site

Demographics

2000 census
As of the census of 2000, there were 378,098 people, 148,316 households, and 102,782 families living in the county. The population density was 656 people per square mile (253/km2). There were 157,024 housing units at an average density of 272 per square mile (105/km2). The racial makeup of the county was 90.28% white, 7.20% black or African American, 0.24% Native American, 0.54% Asian, 0.02% Pacific Islander, 0.29% from other races, and 1.43% from two or more races. 0.92% of the population were Hispanic or Latino of any race.

There were 148,316 households, out of which 31.00% had children under the age of 18 living with them, 54.20% were married couples living together, 11.50% had a female householder with no husband present, and 30.70% were non-families. 26.10% of all households were made up of individuals, and 10.90% had someone living alone who was 65 years of age or older. The average household size was 2.49 and the average family size was 3.00.

In the county, the population was spread out, with 24.80% under the age of 18, 8.30% from 18 to 24, 27.80% from 25 to 44, 24.00% from 45 to 64, and 15.10% who were 65 years of age or older. The median age was 38 years. For every 100 females there were 92.40 males. For every 100 females age 18 and over, there were 88.40 males.

The median income for a household in the county was $39,824, and the median income for a family was $47,747. Males had a median income of $37,065 versus $23,875 for females. The per capita income for the county was $20,417. About 6.80% of families and 9.20% of the population were below the poverty line, including 12.90% of those under age 18 and 6.60% of those age 65 or over.

2010 census
As of the 2010 census, there were 375,586 people, 151,089 households, and 100,417 families living in the county. The racial makeup of the county was 88.7% white, 7.6% black or African American, 0.7% Asian, 0.3% American Indian, 0.5% from other races, and 2.2% from two or more races. Those of Hispanic or Latino origin made up 1.6% of the population. In terms of ancestry, 33.6% were German, 15.5% were Irish, 10.1% were English, 10.1% were Italian, and 7.7% were American.

Of the 151,089 households, 30.2% had children under the age of 18 living with them, 49.2% were married couples living together, 12.7% had a female householder with no husband present, 33.5% were non-families, and 28.1% of all households were made up of individuals. The average household size was 2.42 and the average family size was 2.96. The median age was 41.1 years.

The median income for a household in the county was $44,941 and the median income for a family was $55,976. Males had a median income of $44,238 versus $31,896 for females. The per capita income for the county was $24,015. About 9.5% of families and 12.7% of the population were below the poverty line, including 19.5% of those under age 18 and 6.7% of those age 65 or over.

Politics

Stark County has often been described as "the swing county, in the swing state" when it comes to presidential elections. Locally, it has generally been a strong Republican area, but that changed in the 1990s and into 2000s, where it remained highly competitive for both parties. In 1992, it became a swing county that tilted Democratic, and over the next 15–20 years more local office holders were Democrats.  That has changed, however, in the last 10 years or so, beginning in 2010.  Republicans now hold most of the local elected positions.

|}

Government

Elected officials
 Commissioners: Janet Weir Creighton (R), Bill Smith (R), Richard Regula (R)
 Auditor: Alan Harold (R)
 Clerk of Courts: Lynn Todaro (R)
 Judges of the Court of Common Pleas: Hon. Kristin Farmer (R), Hon. Natalie Haupt (D), Hon. Taryn L. Heath (D), Hon. Francis G. Forchione (D), Hon Chryssa Hartnett (D)
 Coroner: Ron Rusnak M.D. (R)
 Engineer: Keith Bennett (D)
 Family Court: Hon. Rosemarie Hall (R), Hon Jim D. James (R), Hon David R. Nist (R)
 Probate Court: Hon. Dixie Park (R)
 Prosecutor: Kyle Stone (R)
 Recorder: Jamie Walters (R)
 Sheriff: George Maier (D)
 Treasurer: Alex Zumbar (R)

Education

Colleges and universities
 Kent State University at Stark
 Malone University
 Stark State College
 University of Mount Union
 Walsh University

Technical/Career centers
 R. G. Drage Career Technical Center
 Sours Adult Career & Technical Center

Public school districts

 Alliance City School District
 Canton City School District
 Canton Local School District
 Fairless Local School District
 Jackson Local School District
 Lake Local School District
 Louisville City School District
 Marlington Local School District
 Massilon City School District
 Minerva Local School District
 North Canton City School District
 Northwest Local School District
 Osnaburg Local School District
 Perry Local School District
 Plain Local School District
 Sandy Valley Local School District
 Tuslaw Local School District

Private school districts
 Stark County Catholic Schools

High schools

 Alliance High School
 Canton McKinley High School
 Canton South High School
 Central Catholic High School
 Early Collage High School
 East Canton High School
 Fairless High School
 GlenOak High School
 Hoover High School
 Indian River High School
 Jackson High School
 Lake Center Christian School
 Lake Middle/High School
 Louisville High School
 Marlington High School
 Massillon Christian School
 Minerva High School
 Northwest High School
 Perry High School
 St. Thomas Aquinas High School
 Washington High School

Communities

Cities

 Alliance
 Canal Fulton
 Canton (county seat)
 Louisville
 Massillon
 North Canton

Villages

 Beach City
 Brewster
 East Canton
 East Sparta
 Hartville
 Hills and Dales
 Magnolia
 Minerva
 Meyers Lake
 Navarre
 Waynesburg
 Wilmot

Townships
Prior to 1815, Stark County consisted of only eight large townships. After a number of partitions and a few transfers between counties, the townships are:

 Bethlehem
 Canton
 Jackson
 Lake
 Lawrence
 Lexington
 Marlboro
 Nimishillen
 Osnaburg
 Paris
 Perry
 Pike
 Plain
 Sandy
 Sugar Creek
 Tuscarawas
 Washington

https://web.archive.org/web/20160715023447/http://www.ohiotownships.org/township-websites

Census-designated places

 Bolton
 Greentown
 Harrisburg
 Limaville
 Marlboro
 Middlebranch
 North Industry
 North Lawrence
 Perry Heights
 Reedurban
 Richville
 Robertsville
 Uniontown

Unincorporated communities

 Avondale
 Cairo
 Crystal Springs
 East Greenville
 Freeburg
 Justus
 Mapleton
 Marchand
 Maximo
 McDonaldsville
 New Baltimore
 New Franklin
 Newman
 Paris
 Pigeon Run
 Sippo
 Waco

See also
 National Register of Historic Places listings in Stark County, Ohio

References

External links
 Stark County official website
 Canton Stark County Convention & Visitors Bureau official website
 

 
1809 establishments in Ohio
Populated places established in 1809